Rasoul Mollagholipour (Persian:رسول ملاقلی‌پور; also spelled Rasool Mollagholi Poor; 9 September 1955 – 6 March 2007) was an Iranian film director, screenwriter and cinematographer.

Career 
He began his career as a photographer. He directed several short documentaries about the 1980–88 Iran–Iraq War. The film director won critical acclaim for the 16-mm "Neynava".

His movie Mim Mesle Madar (M for Mother, 2006) was a huge success despite its tragic, intense, and shocking scenes. It was selected to represent Iran in the Best Foreign Language Film category at the 2008 Oscars.

He also wrote film scripts and acted as a jury member in Fajr International Film Festival. Afternoon of the 10th Day was his last feature film.

Films 
Neynava (1983)
A Boat to the Beach (1985)
The Flight in the Night (1986)
The Horizon (1988)
Majnoon (1990)
Khosoof (1992)
The Refugee (1993)
Gharche Sammi (The Poisonous Mushroom, 2002)
Mim Mesle Madar (2006)
Afternoon of the 10th Day (2009 - Unfinished, completed by Mojtaba Raie)

See also 
 Iranian cinema

References

External links 
 Official website
 

Iranian film directors
Iranian screenwriters
1955 births
2007 deaths
Crystal Simorgh for Best Director winners
Producers who won the Best Film Crystal Simorgh
20th-century screenwriters